Garðar was the seat of the bishop in the Norse settlements in Greenland. It is a Latin Catholic titular see, and was the first Catholic diocese established in the Americas.

Diocese  
The sagas tell that Sokki Þórisson, a wealthy farmer of the Brattahlíð area, launched the idea of a separate bishop for Greenland in the early 12th century and got the approval of the Norwegian King Sigurd I Magnusson 'the Crusader' (1103–1130). Most of the clergy came from Norway.

Bishops 

 The first bishop of Garðar, Arnaldur, was ordained by the Archbishop of Lund in 1124. He arrived in Greenland in 1126. He began the construction of the cathedral dedicated to St Nicholas, patron saint of sailors.
 The diocese was first assigned to the ecclesiastical province of the German Metropolitan Archbishopric of Bremen. The diocese was subject to the Archdiocese of Lund (present-day Sweden) from 1126 to 1152. Arnaldur returned to Norway in 1150 and became bishop of Hamar (Norway) in 1152.
 In 1152, this diocese, as well as those of Iceland, the Isle of Man, the Orkney Islands and the Faroe Islands, became suffragans to the newly established Norwegian Metropolitan Archdiocese of Nidaros (now Trondheim). The second bishop was Jón Knútr, who served from 1153 to 1186.
 The third bishop was Jón Árnason (nicknamed Smyril). He took office in 1189. In 1202–1203 he went on a pilgrimage to Rome and met Pope Innocent III. He died in Garðar in 1209 and was buried there, most likely in the Northern Chapel of the cathedral.
 The next bishop, Helgi, arrived in Greenland in 1212 and was bishop until his death in 1230.
 In 1234, Nikulás was ordained. He arrived in Greenland in 1239. He died in 1242.
 Ólafr was ordained in the same year, arriving in 1247. He remained bishop until the mid-1280s. He was abroad from 1264 to 1280, thus hardly serving in his own diocese.
 The next bishop was Þórdr, who stayed in Garðar from 1289 until his return to Norway in 1309.
 The next bishop was Árni, from 1315 to 1347. Due to poor communication between Greenland and Norway, it was assumed that he had died and a new bishop (Jón Skalli) was ordained in 1343. When it was discovered that bishop Árni was still alive, Skalli resigned and never went to Greenland. Jon Skalli never visited Garðar.
 After Árni's  death in 1347 there was a 19-year vacancy period. Norwegian cleric Ivar Bardsson served as principal during the interim period. 
Bishop Álfr was ordained in 1365 and served as the last effectively residential bishop of Garðar until 1378.
 The Greenland diocese disappeared in the 15th century, when ships from Norway stopped.
News of the diocese has been reported in two letters by popes Nicholas V and Alexander VI, first compiled by papal chamberlain J. C. Heywood in 1893 in Rome and republished in 1903.

List of residential bishops

Ghost see 
Although the diocese had ceased to function, 'full' bishops were nominated to the see until 1537, apparently none of whom ever visited the diocese:
 Henricus (mentioned in 1386)
 Bertholdus (circa 1407)
 Jacobus Treppe, Friars Minor (O.F.M.) (27 March 1411 – death 1421)
 Nicolaus 
 Robertus Ryngman, O.F.M. (30 May 1425 – ?)
 Gobelinus Volant, Canons Regular of Saint Augustine (C.R.S.A.) (circa 1 October 1431 – 19 March 1432), next bishop of Diocese of Børglum (Denmark) (1432.03.19 – ? not possessed)
 Johannes Erles de Moys, O.F.M. (12 July 1432 – ?)
 Bartholomeus de Sancto Hyppolito, O.P. (1433 – death 1440)
 Gregorius (1440 – 1450)
 Andreas
 Jacobus Blaa, Dominican Order (O.P.) (16 June 1481 – ? deposed)
 Mathias Canuto (Matthias Knutsson), a Danish monk of the Benedictine Order (O.S.B.) (9 July 1492 – ?). He had desired to reach Gardar in person, but there is no indication he ever did.
 Vincenz Kampe, O.F.M. (20 June 1519 – 1537).

Titular see 
In 1996, the diocese was nominally restored as Latin titular bishopric of Gardar (Curiate Italian) / Garðar (Norsk bokmål Norwegian) / Garden(sis) (Latin adjective).

Its single incumbent is Edward William Clark, Auxiliary bishop of Los Angeles (16 January 2001 – present).

Remains 
Currently, the previous settlement of Igaliku is situated on the same geographic location. The site has been the subject of archaeological investigations since the 1830s. The cathedral was the primary target of much of the archaeological work and was fully excavated in 1926 by Danish archaeologist  (1888–1951). Nørlund made several scientific studies in Greenland starting in 1921 and ending in  1932.

Many Norse settlement ruins remain visible in Igaliku. The ruins mostly consist of the stone foundations of the walls in their original positions so that the extent of the settlement, both individual buildings and collectively, can be determined and understood.  The main ruin is of the Garðar Cathedral, a cross-shaped church built of sandstone in the 12th century. The maximum length is 27 m, the width 16 m. Two large barns are on the site, able to have held up to 160 cows.

See also 
 List of Catholic dioceses in Denmark
 Western Settlement
 Middle Settlement
 Eastern Settlement
 Bishop of Greenland (Lutheran Bishop)

References

Sources and external links 

 Grønland i middelalderen fra landnam til undergang
 GCatholic
 Grønlands Forhistorie (Gyldendal København, 2005) 
 Diamond, Jared M. Collapse: How Societies Choose to Fail or Succeed, pg.232; Viking Press, 2005

Further reading 
 Buckland, Paul C. m.fl. (2009). Palaeoecological and historical evidence for manuring and irrigation at Garðar (Igaliku), Norse Eastern Settlement, Greenland. In The Holocene pages 105–116.
 Høegsberg, Mogens Skaaning (2005). Det norrøne bispesæde i Gardar, Grønland (archeology master thesis in Danish). Aarhus University: Afdeling for Middelalder- og Renæssancearkæologi. .
 Mitlid, Åke (2006). Grønlandsgåten. Kampen om Grønland. Levende Historie . 4 (6): 16–19. .
 Plovgaard, Karen (1963). Da Grønland fik sit første bispesæde: Glimt fra nordboriget i det 12. århundrede (PDF). In Tidsskriftet Grønland (Danish) (12): 463–469

Norse settlements in Greenland
Catholic titular sees in North America
Populated places established in the 10th century
Ruins in Greenland
Kujalleq

no:Garðar bispedømme